Clooney ( and) is a townland lying within the civil parish of Kilcronaghan, County Londonderry, Northern Ireland. It lies in north-east of the parish and is bounded in the north by the Moyola River as well as the parish of Termoneeny. It is bounded by the following townlands; Ballynahone Beg,  Ballynahone More, Gortamney, Moyesset, and Tobermore. It was apportioned to the Drapers company as well as freeholds.

The townland was part of Tobermore electoral ward of the former Magherafelt District Council, however in 1926 it was part of Tobermore district electoral division as part of the Maghera division of Magherafelt Rural District. It was also part of the historic barony of Loughinsholin.

History
John O'Donovan, who worked on the Ordnance Survey if the early 19th century, recommended that the townland of Clooney be spelt as "Cloan", however his suggestion was scored out in the Ordnance Survey Name Books and replaced with "Cloney", which was based on the apparent usage of the time. At a later stage it was again revised to the modern spelling "Clooney".

The townland appears to have been originally known along the lines of Ballynecloney, with variations of this spelling used in various sources from 1609 until 1657.

See also
Kilcronaghan
List of townlands in Tobermore
Tobermore

References

Townlands of County Londonderry
Civil parish of Kilcronaghan